Mariana may refer to:

Literature
Mariana (Dickens novel), a 1940 novel by Monica Dickens
Mariana (poem), a poem by Alfred Tennyson, 1st Baron Tennyson
Mariana (Vaz novel), a 1997 novel by Katherine Vaz

Music
"Mariana", a song by Alberto Cortez
"Mariana", a song by Collectif Métissé
"Mariana", a song by Gibson Brothers

Places
Mariana, Minas Gerais, Brazil
Roman Catholic Archdiocese of Mariana
Mariana Lake, Alberta, Canada
Mariana, Corsica
Roman Catholic Diocese of Mariana in Corsica
Mariana, Humacao, Puerto Rico, a barrio
Mariana, Naguabo, Puerto Rico, a barrio
Mariana, a municipality in the province of Cuenca, Spain
Mariana, a Roman town in Hispania, currently named Puebla del Príncipe, in Ciudad Real, Spain
Mariana, Quezon City, a barangay in Metro Manila, the Philippines; better known as New Manila 
Mariana Islands, a group of islands in the north-western Pacific Ocean
Mariana Trench, the deepest trench in the world's oceans
Terra Mariana, alternative name (sobriquet) of modern Estonia, a medieval Holy Roman Empire principality in Estonia and Latvia

Zoology
 Mariana, a synonym for Marianina, a genus of nudibranches 
 Mariana, a synonym for Silybum, a genus of plants

Other uses
Mariana (name)
Mariana (1968 TV series), a Mexican telenovela
Mariana (1970 TV series), a Mexican telenovela
Mariana (Millais), an 1851 painting by John Everett Millais

See also
Ana Maria
Anna Maria (disambiguation)
Great Marianas Turkey Shoot, more formally, The Battle of the Philippine Sea (June 19–20, 1944), a major naval battle of World War II
Pocito Department#The Legend of India Mariana, a legend of Argentina
Marian (disambiguation)
Mariana de la Noche, a 2003 Mexican telenovela
Mariana Mantovana, a commune in the Province of Mantua in the Italian region of Lombardy
Mariana Pineda, a play by Federico García Lorca
Mariana UFO Incident, which occurred in 1950 in Montana, United States
Marianas Trench (band), based in Vancouver, British Columbia, Canada
Marianna (disambiguation)
Mariano
Marina (disambiguation)
Order of the Cross of Terra Mariana